Memphis, Tennessee serves as the Southern headquarters for Tennessee based street organizations in the Southern United States. In 2021, there were approximately 102 gangs with 13,400 gang members in the city. 

Gangs in the Memphis area are concentrated in high crime black neighborhoods like College Park, Hollywood, Hickory Hill, Parkway Village, Westwood, Raleigh, Frayser, Orange Mound, Whitehaven, Binghampton, Klondike and Smokey City; their presence is also felt in the suburbs of Tipton County, Tennessee.

After a series of gang related robberies at Tom Lee Park on the river bluff in downtown Memphis, the Memphis Police Department said that "they often feel powerless to control these out-of-control teens." In May 2013, high school students warned Memphis City Schools against a proposed school merger of Booker T. Washington High School and Carver High school. "It's like putting the Crips and Bloods together in a national convention."

In 2013, Memphis City Council and Memphis Mayor A C Wharton cut funding for Blue CRUSH, the gang division of the Memphis Police Department.

Sex trafficking
In 2013, the FBI arrested Gangster Disciples Folk Nation members on charges of sex trafficking and forced child prostitution.

Neighborhoods
According to the Governor's Public Safety Forum on Tennessee Gangs, gangs operate in Memphis' rural communities like Millington, Mason, and, Northaven, and in low income neighborhoods of North Memphis, South Memphis, Raleigh,  Frayser, Whitehaven, Binghampton, Orange Mound, Hickory Hill and Riverside.

Infamous Memphis gang activity
 Craig Petties, half-brother of DJ Paul, was on the U.S. Marshals 15 Most Wanted Fugitives list before being captured in 2008. He was a member of the Gangster Disciples and allegedly the biggest drug dealer in the history of Memphis, getting drugs directly from Edgar Valdez Villarreal of the Beltrán-Leyva Cartel and funneling millions of dollars to the Black Mafia Family. In 2011, Petties pleaded guilty to 23 counts of violent crime and racketeering after working with the Sinaloa Cartel to build a drug trafficking empire in five states.
 In the 2008 Lester Street murders, a gruesome mass murder in Binghampton, Memphis, Jessie Dotson, a member of the Crips, killed his brother, Cecil Dotson, a member of the Gangster Disciples and his family.
 In 2010, Lorenzen Wright, a Memphis basketball star with a connection to drug kingpin Craig Petties, was found dead after being shot multiple times.
 In February 2013, the Grape Street Crips announced their partnership with Bradley Jenkins, the Imperial Wizard of the United Klan of America, a branch of the Ku Klux Klan in Atlanta, to protest in a planned rally in Memphis.
 In 2014, a mob of 100 to 125 teenagers attacked people at random in a Kroger parking lot during a knockout game-style challenge. They shouted "Fam Mob," the name of a Memphis-based gang. The incident was captured on video that went viral. Eleven people were arrested. According to the police, it was "a flash mob that got out of control."
In 2015, the cousin of Shelby County Sheriff Bill Oldham was targeted in a robbery/homicide after a drug deal gone wrong. On May 29, 2015, a group of Gangster Disciples murdered a recent graduate of Memphis University School. During this time, an over two-year undercover operation by a multi-unit task force was taking place under the name of Operation 38 Special. The multi-state operation was brought to a close on May 4, 2016.

In mainstream culture
Music styles that originated from Memphis gangsta rap culture include Young Dolph, Moneybagg Yo, Pooh Shiesty, Big30, Southern hip hop and crunk, made famous by Skinny Pimp, 8 Ball & MJG, Three 6 Mafia, Project Pat, and Hypnotize Minds. In the 2000s, the music genre gained acceptance after winning an Academy Award for the song "It's Hard out Here for a Pimp" from Hustle & Flow.

See also 

 Crime in Memphis, Tennessee

References

Memphis
Street gangs
Memphis
Organizations based in Memphis, Tennessee